4008 may refer to:

Vehicles
 General Motors TDH-4008, a 1944–1945 American transit bus
 General Motors TDM-4008, a 1944–1945 American transit bus
 Peugeot 4008, a 2012–2017 Japanese-French compact SUV
 Peugeot 3008, a 2016–present French compact SUV, sold in China as Peugeot 4008

Other uses
 4008 Corbin, a stony Phocaea asteroid from the inner regions of the asteroid belt
 A4008 road, a local road in England, United Kingdom